Physignathus is a  monotypic genus of lizards known as the Chinese water dragon.

Physignathus may also refer to:

 Physignathus, a character in the Greek comedy Batrachomyomachia
 Sphodropsis physignathus, a species of the genus of beetles Sphodropsis